"Next Big Thing" is a song co-written and recorded by American country music artist Vince Gill.  It was released in November 2002 as the first single and title track from the album Next Big Thing.  The song reached #17 on the Billboard Hot Country Singles & Tracks chart.  The song was written by Gill, Al Anderson and John Hobbs.

Chart performance

References

2002 singles
2002 songs
Vince Gill songs
Songs written by Al Anderson (NRBQ)
Songs written by Vince Gill
MCA Nashville Records singles
Grammy Award for Best Male Country Vocal Performance winners